Manakov is a Russian masculine surname, its feminine counterpart is Manakova. It may refer to
Gennadi Manakov (born 1950), Russian cosmonaut
Maria Manakova (born 1974), Russian-born Serbian chess player 
Marina Manakov (born 1969), Russian-born German chess player 
Viktor Manakov (disambiguation)

See also
Manakov system in physics

Russian-language surnames